This is a timeline of LGBT Mormon history in the 2010s, part of a series of timelines consisting of events, publications, and speeches about LGBTQ+ individuals, topics around sexual orientation and gender minorities, and the community of members of the Church of Jesus Christ of Latter-day Saints (LDS Church).

Timeline

2010

 2010 – The 2010 edition of the Church Handbook noted that the records of adult members who have participated in "repeated homosexual activities" would be permanently annotated. It also advised that those who have "participated in homosexual activity during or after the last three teenage years will not normally be considered for missionary service." The Handbook 2 also states if members who "feel same-gender attraction but do not engage in any homosexual behavior" may receive church callings and hold temple recommends and serve full-time proselytizing missions.
 2010 – A queer-straight alliance, USGA, began meeting on BYU campus to discuss issues relating to homosexuality and the LDS Church.
 January – The documentary 8: The Mormon Proposition on LDS involvement with California's 2008 Prop 8 debuts at Utah's Sundance Film Festival.
 September – Keith B. McMullin of the Presiding Bishopric addressed the 20th Evergreen International annual conference on September 18 and counseled that if someone says they are homosexual, lesbian, or gay that they should be corrected since it is "simply not true" and God "doesn't speak of His children this way". He further teaches that the "such limitations" as same-gender attraction won't exist after death, though it is not "in and of itself ... neither evil nor sinful".
 September – In a special meeting for some Oakland, California members it was reported that church Seventy and historian Marlin K. Jensen  apologized to straight and gay members for their pain from the California Prop 8 campaign and some other church actions around homosexuality.
 October – Boyd K. Packer delivered an October conference address stating that The Family: A Proclamation to the World "qualifies according to the definition as a revelation". Immediately after referencing "Satan's many substitutes or counterfeits for marriage", he states "some suppose that they were pre-set and cannot overcome what they feel are inborn tendencies toward the impure and unnatural. Not so! Why would our Heavenly Father do that to anyone? Remember, he is our father." His characterization of same-sex physical attractions as "impure and unnatural" tendencies that can be "overcome" sparked a protest of thousands of individuals on October 7 which surrounded Temple Square. Packer later altered his words in the print version of his speech to say "Some suppose that they were preset and cannot overcome what they feel are inborn temptations toward the impure and unnatural. Not so! Remember, God is our Heavenly Father".
 October – On the 24th, First Presidency member Dieter F. Uchtdorf stated on the origin of homosexuality that "Many questions in life, however, including some related to same-gender attractions, must await a future answer, even in the next life."
 October – In response to a petition from the Human Rights Campaign after the suicides of several bullied gay young men the church released a statement condemning unkindness towards those attracted to the same sex.

2011
 2011 – The church website Mormon.org published a member profile with the headline, "I'm Gay. I'm a Mormon" as part of its 2010 "I'm a Mormon" campaign. Members were encouraged to create Mormon.org profiles. The profile disappeared from the archives, however, after early 2015.
 2011 – Deseret Book publishes Ty Mansfield Voices of Hope: Latter-day Saint Perspectives on Same-gender Attraction—An Anthology of Gospel Teachings and Personal Essays.
 2011 – A recording of a committee meeting of top church leaders was leaked by MormonLeaks in which leaders were discussing WikiLeaks and Chelsea Manning's diplomatic cable leaks, apostle Ballard asked if Manning was a "confirmed homosexual", apostle Oaks expressed his suspicion that the "news media cover up anything involving homosexuals when it would work to the disadvantage of the homosexual agenda".
 2011 – The ninth version of the "For the Strength of Youth" pamphlet was released adding to the paragraph on homosexuality that "lesbian behavior" is also a "serious sin" and that the youth should speak to their parents and bishop if they "are being persuaded to participate in inappropriate behavior".
 January – The 28-year-old Mormon John Joe Thomas stated that he had beaten a 70-year-old man to death with rocks because God had told him to, citing scripture on stoning homosexual men in the Bible's Old Testament. He alleged that the mentally-delayed Murray Seidman had made sexual advances on him. Earlier, Thomas had befriended Seidman, and baptized him into the local Philadelphia LDS congregation, and eventually became the sole beneficiary of Seidman's will.
 January – A BYU law student published the book Homosexuality: A Straight BYU Student's Perspective containing arguments in favor of same-sex marriage for which he stated he was threatened with expulsion.
 February – The church's BYU Honor Code was updated to remove the ban on any "advocacy of homosexual behavior" defined as "promoting homosexual relations as being morally acceptable".
 March – Celibate gay Mormon Drew Call was denied his temple recommend renewal and fired from his LDS church printing office job for refusing to give up his gay friends.
 September – Mitch Mayne receives media coverage for being an out gay men serving in a high-profile position as secretary to the bishop.
 September – Affirmation held its annual international conference in the Kirtland, Ohio historic Mormon temple which was reported by many as an important moment.
 November – The first annual, 3-day Circling the Wagons conference was held in Salt Lake City as a nexus for sharing LGBT Mormons experiences, drawing over 300 attendees of diverse religious views. The conference was repeated in 2012, 2014, 2015, and 2016, with 2012 regional conferences held in D.C. and San Francisco.
 November – BYU fired a gay broadcasting department faculty member. The employee stated that BYU had become an increasingly hostile work environment and that being gay played into his being fired.

2012
 2012 – An anonymously authored article was published on the church's website in which a man describes how he lived a "homosexual lifestyle" (engaged in same-sex dating) for a time, but then through counseling with Family Services and local bishop he was able to manage his burden, or struggle, with same-sex attraction. He stated that he was blessed with an alleviation of the intensity of feelings and knows of some people whose burden was lifted and "overcame" same-sex attraction, and no longer experience those feelings. He later married a woman, but states that marriage is not a "cure" for the challenge of same-sex attractions.

 2012 – Mormons Building Bridges was founded.
 January - An edition of the church's New Era magazine for teens addressed a question on whether having friends with homosexual feelings was okay. It advised members to choose friends carefully who have similar values since homosexual behavior violates God's commandments, and that the church condemns the immoral behavior but not the person.
 May - The church released a statement approving the Boy Scouts of America (BSA) administration's decision to remove the ban on homosexual youth (which had been made an official policy in 1991). The church's release stated, "sexual orientation has not previously been—and is not now—a disqualifying factor for boys who want to join [LDS] Scout troops", and that "young men … who agree to abide by Church standards" (which bar any sexual activity) are allowed to participate. The church's policy, however, remains unclear for young men participating in any same-sex dating without sexual activity. The church's agreement with the BSA policy change was important because Mormon scouts constituted the largest group of young men in the BSA (21% in 2010).
 June – Josh Weed a licensed therapist from Seattle married to a woman came out as gay in a widely publicized blog post . He and his wife came out in support of same-sex marriage in 2015 when quotes from them were used without permission in an amicus brief opposing it ahead of the oral arguments in the Supreme Court Obergefell v. Hodges case.
 June – The Family Acceptance Project published the first evidence-based guide for Mormon parents wanting to support their LGBT children.
 October – The apostle Oaks stated that members should assume that children of same-sex couples face the same disadvantages of single and unmarried parents. He also said that youth "struggling with any exceptional condition, including same-gender attraction" need loving and understanding.
 November – The Reconciling Faith and Feelings Conference, sponsored by The Association of Mormon Counselors and Psychotherapists (AMCAP), Evergreen, Foundation for Attraction Research, and North Star, was held in Provo. It was repeated in November 2013.

 December – Jim Dabakis, a former Mormon who had attended BYU in the 70s, and came out at as gay at the age of 23, was elected to the Utah State Senate.

 December – The church launched the website titled Love One Another: A Discussion on Same-Sex Attraction at mormonsandgays.org in December "in an effort to encourage understanding and civil conversation about same-sex attraction." The website states that "individuals do not choose to have such attractions".
 December – LDS public affairs leader Bill Evans met with several high-profile LGBT activists in Salt Lake City at the Alta Club including the national Human Rights Campaign director, Dustin Lance Black, Bruce Bastian, the Utah Pride Center director, and the director of Mormons Building Bridges.

2013
 2013 – Ty Mansfield, a Mormon man who described himself as almost exclusively attracted to men but married to a woman, taught two religion classes in the summer of 2013 at Brigham Young University as an adjunct faculty member.
 January – Seventy Tad R. Callister stated in a speech at BYU-I reprinted in the Ensign that the church's views on same-sex sexual behavior is eternal doctrine and not a temporary policy. He additionally alluded to homosexual feelings as a weakness or imperfection for which those with those tendencies must do all they can to use the refining power of the atonement to convert into a strength through the atonement.
 February – Gay BYU student Jimmy Hales gained media attention with a comedic video of coming out live to family and friends.
 September – Apostle Russell M. Nelson gave a September CES devotional in which he discussed the "debate", "skirmish", and "controversy" around whether "two people of the same gender can be married". He admonished members to gain understanding of the church's position through prayer, pondering, and listening to conference, as well as memorizing and repeating the words of a hymn.

 December – On the 20th same-sex marriages became legally recognized in Utah and within two hours the first same-sex couple was married. They were two former Mormons, medical researcher Michael Ferguson and historian Seth Anderson.
 December – On Christmas Eve Leisha and Amanda LaCrone became the first same-sex couple married in San Pete County, Utah, after being denied the day before. They came from LDS backgrounds, and later reported being harassed by LDS leaders over a disciplinary council in 2016.

2014
 2014 – An Old Testament student manual was released stating that homosexual behavior was one of the grievous sins widely accepted and practiced in the biblical cities of Sodom and Gomorrah leading to their destruction. The manual further discusses homosexuality and encourages members with gay feelings to "avoid lusting".
 January – Evergreen International shuts down and transfers its resources to North Star.
 January – A letter on same-sex marriage was sent to all congregational leaders to be shared with members. The letter reiterated church stances and urged members to review the Family Proclamation and called for "kindness and civility" for supporters of same-sex marriage. It also stated that everyone is welcome in LDS chapels as long as they "respect our standards of conduct while there".
 February – An amicus brief was filed by the church with the US Tenth Circuit Court in defense of Utah's recently overturned Amendment 3 banning same-sex marriage in the state. The brief summarized the church's stance on marriage while stating that the church held no "anti-homosexual animus".

 February – A conservative Mormon blogger gained media attention for her theories that the Disney children's movie Frozen was intended to indoctrinate children by subversively promoting a "gay agenda to normalize homosexuality."
 March – A former Mormon bishop Kevin Kloosterman, who had received media attention for speaking out for LGBT Mormons as a current bishop, received further coverage for being denied entrance to the temple by his bishop as directed by a church seventy in part because of his support of same-sex marriage.
 March – Tyler Glenn, lead singer of Neon Trees, came out as a gay Mormon in a Rolling Stone magazine article, though, he stopped identifying as Mormon by at least April 2016.
 April – The church sent a survey via email to young single adult members in Utah asking among other things about their sexual identity. The options were: "I am heterosexual, but I struggle with same-sex attraction; I am heterosexual and do not struggle with same-sex attraction; Other, please specify." The survey options were criticized as implying that homosexuality doesn't exist and LGBT individuals are straight people who "struggle" with a problem. The question was later changed.
 May – The LDS church's Pioneer Day parade denied entry to the Mormon LGBT allies group Mormons Building Bridges, and continued to deny entry every following year into 2017.
 May – The apostle Ballard gave a CES devotional later reprinted in the September 2015 Ensign in which he quoted the church's website which stated that "individuals do not choose to have [same-sex] attractions".
 September – Another amicus brief on a same-sex marriage case was filed on by the church, this time encouraging the U.S. Supreme Court to hear Utah's Kitchen v. Herbert.
 October – BYU student Curtis Penfold who had been at the university for over two years was kicked out of his apartment, fired from his job, and expulsed from BYU after disagreeing with LDS teachings on LGBT rights. He stated that he, "felt so hated by this community I used to love."
 November – The apostle Eyring stated at an international colloquium on marriage in the Vatican that "We want our voice to be heard against all of the counterfeit and alternative lifestyles that try to replace the family organization". His statement was quoted in the April 2015 general conference by Apostle Tom Perry.

2015
 2015 – A survey of 1,612 LGBT Mormons and former Mormons found that 73% of men and 43% of women had attempted sexual orientation change, usually through multiple methods across many years. It also found that the 51% of the respondents who had entered a mixed-orientation marriage ended up divorcing, and projected that 69% of all these marriages would ultimately end in divorce. The study also found that engaging in mixed-orientation marriages and involvement in the LDS church were correlated with higher rates of depression and a lower quality of life for LGBT people.
 2015 – A version of The Eternal Family manual was released in which teachers are encouraged to ask students to treat lesbian and gay people with greater love, empathy, sensitivity, compassion and kindness and to evaluate their attitudes and actions towards homosexual individuals to see if they are Christ-like.
 2015 – An edition of the New Testament guide for seminary students was released which interpreted a scripture in Romans as saying that lesbian and homosexual behavior is "against nature".

 January – The TLC special My Husband's Not Gay aired on the 11th featuring LDS men attracted to men but dating or married to women. Church spokesperson Eric Hawkins stated in response to media questions that the Church "does not promote marriage as a treatment method for same-sex attraction" and that religious couples in a mixed-orientation marriage should have our "support and respect".
 January – Church leaders held a "Fairness for All" news conference on the 27th supporting LGBT non-discrimination laws for housing and employment that would also protect religious individuals. Apostle D. Todd Christofferson opened calling for "a way forward" to balance religious freedom and LGBT rights. Next Neill Marriott of the presidency of Young Women's recognized the "centuries of ridicule, persecution and even violence against homosexuals". Oaks followed stating that the church rejects "persecution and retaliation of any kind, including persecution based on ... gender or sexual orientation" and called on all levels of government to pass legislation protecting "religious freedoms ... while also protecting ... LGBT citizens in ... housing, employment, and public accommodation." Holland closed outlining the church's stance on religious freedom. In answer to a press question afterwards Christofferson stated that "understanding is possible" and affirmed his love for his brother Tom who is gay and had been in a 20-year relationship with another man.
 March – The "Utah Compromise" was struck on the 4th between the LDS Church and LGBT advocates, creating a nondiscrimination law in Utah that also includes religious protections.
 March – In early March the church released a public statement and employed its lobbyists to garner support of a proposed nondiscrimination and religious rights bill in Utah. The bill would grant previously non-existent housing and employment protection for LGBT persons in Utah. Though similar bills had failed 6 times before, SB 296 was passed on March 11 and another statement of church approval was released. The new law, nicknamed the "Utah Compromise", was praised by many.
 March – After a disciplinary council on February 10, John Dehlin is excommunicated from the LDS church on March 8 in a highly publicized case. He stated that it came in part because of his visible advocacy for same-sex marriage, and his stake president had previously stated that, "if you come out openly in support of [same-sex marriage] that is a problem." An appeal was denied by the church's highest authority.
 March – The apostle Christofferson gave an interview on the 13th in which he acknowledged the diversity of sociopolitical views among church members and stated that advocating for same-sex marriage on social media or holding political beliefs differing from official church stances would not threaten a members standing in the church. He also stated that church leaders had "gained added understanding [of LGBT people] over the years, especially in recent years", though, he said the church would never accept same-sex marriage. In his closing answer to a question on members feeling on the outside because of their position on same-sex marriage, he stated that obedience to principles taught by the church may require "very significant sacrifice" for "all of mortal life", but "no one is predestined to a second class status" and that the result can be "a state of happiness".
 March – The church released Ministering Resources–Same-Sex Attraction for local leaders, which included the advice to "avoid offering overly simplified responses, such as the idea that ... missionary service will eliminate same-sex attraction." Former bishop Robert Rees stated in 2016 that he counseled many gay members who followed church leader promises about changing their sexual orientation via missions, temple attendance, and scripture reading, and when change didn't came they often blamed themselves for not being righteous enough and this led to many attempted and successful suicides.
 April – The church filed an amicus brief with the Sixth Circuit Court on a pending consolidated same-sex case stating that allowing same-sex marriage would "impede the ability of religious people to participate fully as equal citizens".
 June – Three days after the US Supreme Court ruled in favor of same-sex marriage the First Presidency sent a letter on the 29th to be read to every US congregation affirming that "Changes in the civil ... cannot change the moral law that God has established." The letter clarified that leaders should not perform same-sex marriages and that any church property cannot be used for any activities "associated with same-sex marriages". It was noted, however, that "all visitors are welcome" on church property if church standards of conduct are respected.
 June – D. Todd Christofferson acknowledged that "we have individual members in the church with a variety of different opinions, beliefs and positions on these issues and other issues...In our view, it doesn't really become a problem unless someone is out attacking the church and its leaders," and stated that members who openly supported LGBT marriage would not be excommunicated.
 July – The church made a $2,500 donation to the Utah Pride Center which serves LGBTQ persons around Salt Lake City.
 July – After the Supreme Court decision making same-sex marriage legal through the US, top church leaders sent out a letter to be read in all US congregations reaffirming the church's position on marriage and calling for civility.
 July – A church statement is released saying leaders are "deeply troubled" and re-evaluating its scouting program, as a Boy Scouts of America policy change permits openly gay scout leaders.
 August – Courtney and Rachelle who were formerly married received media attention over their divorce in order to join the LDS church.
 August – The LDS Church announces it will stay in the Boy Scouts of America program, despite concerns over permitting openly gay scout leaders.
 August – Following a Boy Scouts of America (BSA) policy change on July 27 allowing for gay scout leaders (though allowing for churches to continue banning them) the church stated that it has "always welcomed" gay youth, but that "the admission of openly gay leaders is inconsistent with the doctrines of the Church". The official press release (preceded by one on May 21 and July 13) alluded to a potential change in church relations with the BSA by stating "the century-long association with Scouting will need to be examined". Despite the majority of church members wanting to drop relations with the BSA, however, no change in relations occurred.
 September – Presidency of the Seventy member Rasband gave a BYU address (later reprinted in the Ensign) in which he addressed concerns about the church's involvement in politics. He shared hypothetical stories of a man fired for being gay and a woman marginalized at work for being Mormon and bemoaned that it is less politically correct to empathize with the religious woman. He invited listeners to discuss LGBT rights and religious freedom and to write comments on his Facebook post.
 October – Apostle Dallin H. Oaks publicly disagreed with refusing gay marriages in violation of the recent supreme court ruling.  Days later at the World Congress of Families, apostle Russell Ballard urges tolerance for the opposition.
 2015 – A church spokesperson stated that Family Services no longer offers any sexual-orientation change efforts, but are willing to help clients reconcile their attractions and religious beliefs. He also stated that their neutral stance on independent SOCE programs like Journey Into Manhood should not be taken as an endorsement.
 November – On the 5th an update letter to leaders for the Church Handbook was leaked. The policy banned a "child of a parent living in a same-gender relationship" from baby blessings, baptism, confirmation, priesthood ordination, and missionary service until the child was not living with their homosexual parent(s), was "of legal age", and "disavow[ed] the practice of same-gender cohabitation and marriage", in addition to receiving approval from the Office of the First Presidency. The policy update also added that entering a same-sex marriage as a type of "apostasy", mandating a disciplinary council. The next day, in a video interview, Todd Christofferson clarified that the policy was "about love" and "protect[ing] children" from "difficulties, challenges, conflicts" where "parents feel one way and the expectations of the Church are very different". On November 13, the First Presidency released a letter clarifying that the policy applied "only to those children whose primary residence is with a couple living in a same-gender marriage or similar relationship" and that for children residing with parents in a same-sex relationship who had already received ordinances the policy would not require that "privileges be curtailed or that further ordinances be withheld". The next day around 1,500 members gathered across from the Church Office Building to submit their resignation letters in response to the policy change with thousands more resigning online in the weeks after Two months later, in a satellite broadcast, Russell M. Nelson stated that the policy change was "revealed to President Monson" in a "sacred moment" when "the Lord inspired [him] ... to declare ... the will of the Lord".
 November – Utah married couple April Hoagland and Beckie Peirce were denied guardian rights over their foster child because of their sexual orientation by BYU graduate, former stake presidency counselor, and Mormon bishop judge Scott Johansen, leading to calls for his impeachment and resulting in his retirement.
 November – Seattle couple Celeste Carolin and Kathleen Majdali received media attention over their upcoming marriage that put them at risk of excommunication from the LDS church.
 November – An event on "overcoming" homosexuality through therapy hosted by BYU-Idaho faculty member Michael Williams was scheduled to be held the on BYU-Idaho campus and was advertised in church meetings. The event was cancelled, however, after receiving negative press. At the time BYU-I publicly hosted a video of Williams discussing ways to "treat" same-sex attraction, though, it is now accessible to students only.

2016
 2016 – BYU and church policies on LGBT persons got the spotlight as these served as a deterrent in their football team being considered as a Fall addition to the Big 12 Conference, a consideration which was ultimately denied.
 January – Esquire magazine published a piece on a gay church member and former members, brothers Logan and Garrett Smith and Garrett's husband Kyle Cranney.
 January – The church released a statement through spokesman Dale Jones mourning the reported suicides of 32 LGBT Mormons. It said leaders and members are taught to "reach out in an active, caring way to all, especially to youth who feel estranged or isolated".
 February – The LGBT Mormon and former-Mormon parent support group Mama Dragons received national media attention for its reports of LGBT Mormon youth suicides.
 February – The apostle Oaks was asked about church leaders and members' responsibility for the treatment of LGBT individuals that may have precipitated in suicides to which he stated "that's a question that will be answered on judgment day" and that "nobody is sadder about a case [of suicide] like that than I am".
 February – In a church statement on spokesperson Dale Jones spoke against passing any LGBT-related laws which could affect the "careful balance" of religious liberty and gay rights. The statement was in reference to proposed Utah hate crime bill SB107 which would add sexual orientation to the current law's list of existing groups protected by law from hate crimes in Utah. The bill failed as it had in past years and its sponsor a Mormon Republican senator criticized his church for its opposition to the bill citing the church's press release as the reason for its failure.
 February – The apostle Bednar answered a members question in a February 23 broadcast stating that "there are no homosexual members of the Church" since we are not defined by sexual attraction or behavior and "all of us have different challenges in the flesh". He compared homosexuality to a physical handicap like "being born with a body that is not fully functional".
 March – Apostle Holland addressed a question on homosexuality in the church's first "face to face" broadcast event for youth on March 8. Stated at around 1 hour and 13 minutes into the broadcast, the question referred to homosexual members who felt "scared", "alone", and like they didn't "fit into the Lord's kingdom". Holland respond that the church does not "make any attempt to say why ... or how [homosexual attractions] happened" and that those with homosexual attractions have "complexities in their makeup" that we don't fully understand. He continued saying that what the church asks "for those inclined to a homosexual feeling is exactly what we ask for those with heterosexual feelings" and that the church is not making them "second-class citizens", later comparing them to women who never married.
 March – Church spokesperson Eric Hawkins stated that the church "denounces any therapy that subjects an individual to abusive practices" and hopes LGBT Mormons "find compassion and understanding from family members, professional counselors and church members". The statement was in response to media inquiries around the experiences of a lesbian Mormon teen who beginning in 2010 was subjected to physically abusive conversion therapy techniques in an attempt to change her sexual orientation leading to a suicide attempt.
 April – An application for a booth at the Salt Lake City pride parade by a website with gay male Mormon-themed erotic material was initially approved and then later denied by the event organizers.
 June – The Mexican area authority presidency had a letter read in congregations around the country urging members to oppose the national legalization of same-sex marriage and pointed them to the political organization Conciencia Nacional por la Libertad Religiosa.

 July – After a court ruling, the parent company over one of the largest LDS dating sites, LDSsingles.com, was required to allow same-sex dating as an option.
 September – The Student Government at Iowa State University passed a resolution stating their opposition to Brigham Young University joining the Big 12 Conference as a result of BYU's anti-LGBTQ policies in its Honor Code.
 October – Young Women's General President Bonnie L. Oscarson gave a conference speech in which she stated that Mormons shouldn't avoid speaking boldly against Satan's lies like same-sex marriage out of fear of offending gay people.
 October – On October 25, the Mormons and Gays website was revised and moved to mormonandgay.lds.org An important addition to the website was the statement that "it is unethical to focus professional treatment on an assumption that a change in sexual orientation will or must occur."
 October – Tyler Glenn releases his solo album, "Excommunication", about his experience with the LDS Church and his frustration with their policies.

 November – Salt Lake City native Misty Snow wins over 1/4th of Utah votes for state senator, as the first transgender nominee for a major party to the nation's Senate. She was raised in a Mormon household.

 December – An LGBT resource center "Encircle" is founded in Provo, Utah across from a Mormon temple by a member. A church spokesperson welcomes the center saying it's good to see the property being used to serve LGBT people.
 December – Apostle Christofferson answered a youth's question on homosexuality at a "face to face" church broadcast in Guatemala. About 56 minutes into the broadcast he stated that "we don't know much about the causes" of why one would feel attractions to someone of the same sex, but stated that those individuals do not choose to feel those attractions and that the only sin would be in "acting" on those feelings. He encouraged the congregation of youth to respect, include, and fellowship those individuals and made clear that the church is not a place for gossip or making fun of a homosexual persons. He cited his brother Tom as a "great example" of a gay member of the church.

2017
 January – The Boy Scouts of America announced in January that transgender boys can join their troops prompting a wait-and-see response from the church. The church withdrew its support of the program for older teens four months later, though it denied any link to the policy changes around LGBT people.
 February – The church filed an amicus brief with the US Supreme Court over the transgender bathroom case (G. G. v. Gloucester County School Board). The brief acknowledged the "heavy burdens" of gender dysphoria and stating that those who experience these "deserve compassion and respect", but opposed the interpretation of sex in Title IX as gender identity.
 March – SB 196 was signed into law which overturned the "no promo homo" laws which had banned "advocacy of homosexuality" while allowing for negative discussions in public schools. Former Mormon Troy Williams of Equality Utah was a driving force behind the change, and he stated that they had worked together with the LDS Church and the majority Mormon legislature to change the laws. One paper stated that the LDS Church was largely behind the reasoning for the laws and anti-gay culture of Utah. Similar laws were still enforced in seven conservative states mostly in the Southern US as of 2017.
 March – The church published a video and blog post in March highlighting the Mackintosh's acceptance of their gay post-Mormon son and LGBT people. The video was added to mormonandgay.lds.org.
 April – An Ensign article by Seventy Larry Lawrence stated that "same-sex marriage is only a counterfeit" and quoted a canonized LDS scripture where Jesus warns that a counterfeit "is not of God, and is darkness".
 April – The apostle Jeffrey R. Holland stated in general conference that God created diversity and the loss of those on the margins of the church is felt by all and that, "There is room [in the church] for those with differing sexual attractions."
 May – Twelve-year-old Savannah came out to her Utah ward as lesbian during a fast and testimony meeting. During her speech a Stake Presidency member had the mic cut off and told her to sit down. A video of the event gained media attention.
 May – The production of the documentary Faithful: A Lesbian Mormon Story telling the story of two lesbian Mormons, Lauralie and Marylu, received media attention.
 June – An anonymous essay by a Mormon mother of a lesbian daughter was published on the church's website in which she stated that, "the decision we made to even allow a [child's same-sex] partner to stay in the home might not be appropriate for other families. The presence of younger children or other factors may make what works for us unfeasible for someone else."
 June – Former stake president and church architect Laurie Lee Hall was excommunicated by her Utah local leaders for socially transitioning to express her gender identity as a transgender woman. She had experienced years of suicidal ideation and gender dysphoria before being released as a stake president in 2012. She reported being released because of expressing her identity and later decided to come out to her entire congregation in July 2016.
 July – A Fourth of July parade in the over 75% LDS town of Provo, Utah, reportedly gave permission then denied entry the day before the parade to the new Provo LGBT Mormon resource center Encircle garnering national attention.
 July – An instructor at the church's BYU-Idaho reported being fired after refusing to take down a post on her private Facebook page in support of LGBT rights. Her story gained national media attention.
 August – Minutes from a February 2014 Layton, Utah meeting for stake leaders were released without authorization in which the apostle L. Tom Perry stated that gay young men need association with "manly things" and strong, vigorous men who know the power they hold. He also stated that he does not believe that people are born with attractions to those of the same sex, but that it's instead a temptation like any other. He further stated that supporting same-sex marriage would "incriminate" members seeking to renew their temple recommend and that same-sex couples expressing any physical affection during church meetings should be allowed to attend but reprimanded by leaders in private. The importance of opposite-sex marriage was stressed with the statement that Jesus and the prophets believed in it and that allowing evil like this to grow would destroy the basic family unit and bring calamities.
 August – The apostle Oaks told Kansas youth to not use sexual orientation labels on themselves, and that he has letters from people who stopped having gay feelings and married and had children.

 August – The church's newsroom released a statement on the 16th in support of the upcoming Utah County benefit concert, LoveLoud Fest, for LGBT youth held by popular bands Imagine Dragons, and Neon Trees. Former BYU student and Imagine Dragons lead singer Dan Reynolds as well as gay former Mormon and Neon Trees lead singer Tyler Glenn had both publicly criticized the church for its policies and treatment of LGBT people. The bands performed for a sold-out crowd of 17,000.
 September – The Pacific area presidency sent a letter to be read in all Australian congregations which reemphasized the church's position against same-sex marriage and parenting and urged members to vote in the upcoming national referendum on the issue.
 September – The LDS Church signs an amicus brief supporting wedding cake bakers discriminating against same-sex couples in a Colorado court case.

 September – Tom Christofferson, the 60-year-old gay brother of church apostle D. Todd Christofferson, published his book on his 19-year relationship with another man and later return to involvement with the LDS Church. The book was published by the LDS church's Deseret Book publishers. He later participated in a panel discussion at the University of Utah.
 September – The apostle Oaks stated that the Family Proclamation's teachings on same-sex marriage were not changeable policies but statements of eternal truth, the will of God, and the basis for church teachings and practice over the last two decades. He lamented the increase in public acceptance of same-sex marriage and acknowledged the conflicts with friends and family that opposing this acceptance could cause. He further stated that despite the conflict church members should choose God and the LDS church's plan and way.
 October – Apostle Dallin H. Oaks speaks in General Conference about "The Plan and the Proclamation". He states that "Converted Latter-day Saints believe that the family proclamation, issued nearly a quarter century ago and now translated into scores of languages, is the Lord's reemphasis of the gospel truths we need to sustain us through current challenges to the family. Two examples are same-sex marriage and cohabitation without marriage. Just 20 years after the family proclamation, the United States Supreme Court authorized same-sex marriage, overturning thousands of years of marriage being limited to a man and a woman." 
 November – In response to a question about LGBT young single adults in the church, apostle Ballard tells BYU students in a campus-wide event that, "I believe you have a place in the kingdom and recognize that sometimes it may be difficult for you to see where you fit in the Lord's Church, but you do." He also told cisgender, heterosexual members, "We need to listen to and understand what our LGBT brothers and sisters are feeling and experiencing. Certainly, we must do better than we have done in the past so that all members feel they have a spiritual home." He further explained that church leaders believe "core rights of citizenship should be protected for all people — for LGBT people, for people of all faiths," and that "reasonable compromises" should be found "in other areas when rights conflict." He stated that church leaders supported the recent LoveLoud Festival to send a message that "LGBT youth or anyone else should never be mistreated".
 November – Apostles Oaks and Ballard gave a broadcast in which they answered some pre-submitted questions, including those about homosexual members. Oaks stated that members should avoid labeling themselves, and "the commandment to love one another and help bear one another's burdens—that comes first." Ballard stated that members need to be willing to talk about the subject and to listen.
 December – The 1981 church guide on homosexuality that taught that masturbation made people gay received media attention.

2018
 January – An obituary for the recently deceased church president Thomas S. Monson mentioned church actions on LGBT topics during his presidency that had garnered national attention. Many Mormons felt the obituary focused too much on controversies during Monson's presidency such as those around LGBT topics.
 January – Top leaders Nelson and Oaks answered a press question on LGBT people.
 January – A documentary on the AIDS crisis in Utah "Quiet Heroes" debuted at Utah's Sundance Film Festival. The film touched upon the effects the teachings and norms of the Mormon community played in the crisis including the effects that the state's religious monoculture had on furthering the marital spread of AIDS through closeted gay Mormon men who were pressured to marry women, but cheated on their spouse.
 January – The documentary "Believer" featuring Imagine Dragon's Mormon lead singer Dan Reynolds premiered at the Sundance Film Festival. The documentary discusses Dan's experiences with the intersection of LGBTQ youth and the Mormon community and its norms, as well as LGBT Mormon suicides.
 January – The LDS Church began running Facebook and YouTube advertisements on LGBTQ topics.
 January – The divorce of a Mormon gay man Josh Weed from his wife Lolly after a 15-year-long marriage brought media attention to Mormon mixed-orientation marriages.
 February – The church-run Family Services stated in the church's newspaper that it no longer provides reparative therapy or sexual orientation change efforts.
 February – Bishop Paul Augenstein and his wife Susie organize a 5th Sunday meeting about the needs of LGBTQ Latter-Day Saints in their Riverton, Utah ward. They included LGBTQ speakers as well as allies.
 February – Former bishop Richard Ostler starts a podcast called "Listen, Learn, and Love." The primary goal is to highlight experiences of LGBTQ members and to learn from their stories.
 March – BYU Student Life hosted the first church-university-hosted LGBT campus event. It featured a panel of four students answering student-submitted questions.
 April – After a controversy over BYU's policies around LGBT people, a conference for the US Society for Political Methodology was moved off of campus citing a "long-strained relations between the LGBTQ community and BYU" and concerns over the university's ban on homosexual behavior which the Society repudiated along with "the intolerance it represents."
 May – The LDS Church announced that its charter with the Boy Scouts of America will end in 2019. The separation between the two groups comes as the Boy Scouts had evolved since 2010 on several issues, including allowing gay and transgender people into membership and leadership, which was opposed by the LDS Church.
 June – The LDS Church released a statement in favor of the US Supreme Court ruling on the Masterpiece Cakeshop v. Colorado Civil Rights Commission case over a business owner who refused to serve a gay couple.
 June – The Westboro Baptist Church protested the LDS Church in Rexburg, stating in a press release that due in part to their teachings on polygamy, Mormons would go to hell along with gay and transgender people. In February 2008 they had also protested in Salt Lake City at the funeral of church president Gordon B. Hinckley, and criticized Hinckley as being too accepting and ambiguous in speaking about gay people.
 June – Celebrity talk show host Ellen DeGeneres spoke about LGBT Mormon youth and suicides during an interview with Dan Reynolds about his Believer documentary. Reynolds also discussed LGBTQ Mormons on The Daily Show with Trevor Noah.

 June – Hours after agreeing to a non-discrimination clause in order to receive local tax funds the Provo Freedom Festival board denied LGBTQ groups a spot in the parade for the second year in a row sparking public outcry and criticism from Provo's mayor and Utah County Commissioner. One of these groups included a float of local Mormon LGBTQ veterans representing Mormons Building Bridges. After negotiations, the festival leaders decided to allow the groups to march. However, the day before the parade one LGBT group was almost forced out of the grand parade, and the groups were told they could not have rainbow flags.
 June – The Mormon Tabernacle Choir and San Francisco Gay Men's Chorus performed a rehearsal song together in San Francisco.
 July – Church leaders' continued denial of BYU LGBT students' years of requests to form a club on campus received national coverage.
 August – BYU professor Eric Huntsman gave a BYU campus-wide devotional mentioning gay Mormons Tom Christofferson, and a Mormon Tabernacle Choir singer Alex. Huntsman said Alex felt frequent pain, struggle and loneliness trying to stay in the LDS church. He further stated that, "For not just our LGBTQ+ sisters and brothers but for many people, the choice to love can literally make the difference between life and death."
 August – The gay, LDS-raised Salt Lake County Republican Party's communication director Dave Robinson stated that while many people attribute the high LGBT suicide rate in Utah to the culture of The Church of Jesus Christ of Latter-day Saints he believed it had more to do with self-loathing caused by having too much sex with too many different partners, and that HIV-preventive drugs cause gay men to have sex like "bunny rabbits."
 August – The documentary Church and State—which highlights the events surrounding the battle for same-sex marriage in Utah—debuts at the Broadway Theatre in Utah. 
 August – The church-published magazine LDS Living produced an article in which a gay Mormon man said that his mission president's loving response to him coming out "saved [his] life" and "prepared the way ... to handle the incredibly, overwhelmingly negative reactions [he] would get from every other priesthood leader and family member he came out to after."
 August – Kris A. Irvin, a transgender male and BYU student, was interviewed by the Salt Lake Tribune. They are considering top surgery to help with their gender dysphoria, but face expulsion from BYU and excommunication from the church.
 October – Apostle Oaks speaks in General Conference about "Truth and the Plan". He states "...some are troubled by some of our Church's positions on marriage and children. Our knowledge of God's revealed plan of salvation requires us to oppose current social and legal pressures to retreat from traditional marriage and to make changes that confuse or alter gender or homogenize the differences between men and women. We know that the relationships, identities, and functions of men and women are essential to accomplish God's great plan."
 December – Studio C cast member Stacey Harkey comes out as gay.
 December – The book Gay Rights and the Mormon Church, written by historian Greg Prince, is published.

2019
 2019 – The church updated the Ministering Resources—Same-Sex Attraction page for leaders stating, "Avoid promising a reduction or elimination of same-sex attraction in exchange for faithfulness or missionary service."
 January – David Matheson, a top proponent of "conversion therapy", announces that he is gay and is getting divorced to live his life as a gay man.
 February – Former BYU mascot Charlie Bird comes out as gay.
 April – November 2015 policy changes announced. Children of parents who identify themselves as lesbian, gay, bisexual, or transgender may now be blessed as infants and baptized in the LDS Church without First Presidency approval. In addition, the church will no longer characterize same-gender marriage by a church member as "apostasy" for purposes of church discipline, although it is still considered "a serious transgression".
 April – BYU valedictorian Matt Easton speaks at a BYU commencement ceremony. He states "I stand before my family, friends and graduating class today to say that I am proud to be a gay son of God."
 June – President Russell M. Nelson meets with Pulse nightclub owner Barbara Poma to offer condolences in the shooting three years prior.
 June – President Dallin H. Oaks speaks at a devotional at BYU Hawaii. He says, "Along with these challenges—and caused by them—we are confronted by a culture of evil and personal wickedness in the world.  This includes.....the increasing frequency and power of the culture and phenomenon of lesbian, gay, and transgender lifestyles and values."
 June – A neighborhood in Sandy, Utah (a city with a high percentage of Latter-Day Saints), displayed Pride flags for Pride Week.
 June – BYU track athlete Emma Gee comes out as bisexual.
 August – Edward Smart, father of Elizabeth Smart, came out as gay and stated that he no longer found solace in the LDS Church and that he'd watched for years as, "LGBTQ individuals both in and out of the Church have been victims of ridicule, shunning, rejection and outright humiliation."
 September – President Russell M. Nelson spoke at a BYU devotional--"The Love and Laws of God". He stated "...let's consider the definition of marriage. In recent years, many countries, including the United States, have legalized same-sex marriage. As members of the Church, we respect the laws of the land and abide by them, including civil marriage. The truth is, however, that in the beginning—in the beginning—marriage was ordained by God! And to this day it is defined by Him as being between a man and a woman. God has not changed His definition of marriage."
 October – Apostle Oaks spoke of three fundamental doctrinal truths that God has revealed: "First, … that God created 'male and female,'" and that this "binary creation is essential to the plan of salvation." "Second, modern revelation teaches that eternal life, the greatest gift of God to His children, is only possible through the creative powers inherent in the combination of male and female joined in an eternal marriage (see Doctrine and Covenants 132:19). That is why the law of chastity is so important." "Finally, the long-standing doctrinal statements reaffirmed in [The Family: A Proclamation to the World] 23 years ago will not change. They may be clarified as directed by inspiration." For example, "the intended meaning of gender in the family proclamation and as used in Church statements and publications since that time is biological sex at birth."
 October – The United States Supreme Court hears 3 cases of LGBTQ people who claimed they were fired because of their identities.
 October – Apostle Oaks spoke in the Women's Session of General Conference on the "Two Great Commandments". He stated "Our zeal to keep [the second great commandment] must not cause us to forget the first, to love God with all our heart, soul and mind. We show that love by keeping His commandments." "The leaders of the Church must always teach the unique importance of marriage between a man and a woman and the related law of chastity." "Our walk must be considerate of children who are uncertain about their sexual orientation, but it discourages premature labeling because in most children such uncertainty decreases significantly over time." "...among those the women of this Church may save will be their own dear friends and family who are currently influenced by worldly priorities and devilish distortions."

See also

 Homosexuality and The Church of Jesus Christ of Latter-day Saints
 Law of adoption (Mormonism)
 LGBT rights in Utah
 LGBT Mormon suicides
 List of Christian denominational positions on homosexuality
 Mormonism in the 21st century
 Sexuality and Mormonism

References

LGBT and Mormonism
LGBT history in the United States
Timelines of Christianity
History of the Latter Day Saint movement
LGBT timelines
21st century in LGBT history
LGBT Mormon